Gary McMurray is a wheelchair rugby player from New Zealand, and a member of the national team, the Wheel Blacks.

Gary was a member of the wheel blacks at the inaugural Paralympic wheelchair rugby tournament in 1996 Summer Paralympics where it was a demonstration event.  He remained a part of the team for the next two paralympics where the team won bronze in 2000 and the gold medal in 2004.

References

External links 
 
 

Paralympic wheelchair rugby players of New Zealand
Wheelchair rugby players at the 1996 Summer Paralympics
Wheelchair rugby players at the 2000 Summer Paralympics
Wheelchair rugby players at the 2004 Summer Paralympics
Paralympic gold medalists for New Zealand
Paralympic bronze medalists for New Zealand
Living people
Medalists at the 1996 Summer Paralympics
Medalists at the 2000 Summer Paralympics
Medalists at the 2004 Summer Paralympics
Year of birth missing (living people)
Paralympic medalists in wheelchair rugby